The Yamaha DT200 is a dual-purpose motorcycle manufactured during the 1980s, 1990s, and continues into the 2000s (decade) by the Yamaha Motor Company. Though never imported into the US, the rest of the world, including Canada, received some of these models. The DT200LC began production in 1983bc. It also was very similar to the DT125LC. This model continued production until 1988.Then, in 1989 a totally new model was introduced, DT200R, as well as a similar DT125R. In Canada, the DT125LC/R was never imported. 
 
In Canada, the new model sold until 1996. It continued in South America, the Middle East, Europe, Australia, and Africa. It spawned the DT125, in two versions, as well as a WR200. Today it has been redesigned as a DT230R, as well as the DT200R for South America, which is a hybrid of the LC and R models.  Competition for the DT200R came from Suzuki's TS200RM, imported into Canada from 1991 until 1993. Honda never imported its superior CRM250 into North America. The DT200 or WR200 used a liquid cooled, oil injected, (autolube) case reed inducted, Y.P.V.S. power valved (electronically operated power valve system while motocross bikes are equipped with mechanically operated power valve system),flat slide carburetion, resin reeds, single cylinder, 2 stroke engine.  As a dual-purpose bike, it was designed for on and off-road use, Yamaha has another 2 models, the DT200WR with oil pump code 3xp, which was only sold in the Japanese home market, and WR200R with premix, code 4bf. The WR200R was sold in Canada, U.S.A., and many other countries around the world. The WR200R was sold as an off-road only model and had many similarities with the DT200WR. Some of the differences between the "R" and "WR" models were the oil pump, carburetor, TM30SS vs.TM28SS, larger reed cage with 6 petals vs. 4 petals, longest final gear for the 3xp, plastic tank vs.steel gas tank, little shorter seat height on DT200WR model, with the same design in full body generally the 3xp was the model for every day use, plus 10 kg of weight. 
The WR200R cylinder had exhaust boost ports, whereas the DT200R didn't. In addition, the DT200WR had oil injection.

Specifications 

Displacement: 195 c.c., Bore & Stroke: 66 m.m. X 57 m.m.

Compression Ratio 6.4:1

Spark Plug NGK BR9ES, Gap:.7 to .8 m.m.

Carburetion: One Mikuni TM28SS

Starting: Primary Kick

Ignition: C.D.I., Generator: Flywheel Magneto

Coolant Capacity: 1.20 litres (including all routes)

Fuel Capacity: 10 litres with 1.8 litres reserve.

Oil Tank Capacity: 1.2 L (1.1 Imperial quarts; 1.38 US quarts)(Engine Oil)

Transmission: 6 speed, Transmission Oil: SAE 10W30 type SE oil, Periodic Change:0.75 litre, Total Amount: 0.80 litre

Stock Gearing: (F/R) 13 teeth/43 teeth, Chain: 528V6/Daido, Links: 105+ joint, Free Play: 25–40 m.m.

Caster Angle: 27.5 m.m., Trail: 113 m.m. Maximum Load: Front: 47 kg, Rear: 134 kg.

Tire Sizes:(F/R) 3.00-21", 4.60-18". 
Tire Pressures: (F/R in PSI) Up to 90 kg: 18/22, 90 kg to Max. Load: 22/26, Off Road: 18/22.

Wheel Sizes (F/R) 21" X 1.60", 18" X 2.15"

Brakes: front, 230 m.m. with single piston caliper, rear, 220 m.m. with single piston caliper ( 1989 and newer)

Horsepower: 33 bhp /8500 rpm, Torque: 23.5 Nm (17.4 lb-ft) /7500 rpm

Standing quarter mile:14.73 seconds @ 138.46 km/h (Cycle Canada January 1989)

Top speed: 142 km/h 88mph

Suspension Front: Telescopic 41 m.m.front fork, damper rod, with air adjustment, 270 mm travel

Suspension Rear: "Monocross" remote reservoir single shock, adjustable preload and rebound damping, 270 mm travelMinimum Ground Clearance: 12.4 inches/315 m.m.
  Weight:''' Dry-108 kg/238 pounds, Wet-122 kg/268 pounds(Basic weight with oil and fuel full.)

The DT200R is a capable, recreational bike, and has been used in enduro competition with some limited success, although it was never intended as a competitive racer. This machine is a stealth motorcycle event sound tests it registers between 74 and 82 dbA. Meeting noise level requirements has never been an issue.

The DT200R shares similar engine cases with the ATV BLASTER - But the Blaster is not crank case induction like the DT200R. Both DT200R & Blaster crank shafts are compatible, the DT200R piston doesn't have port's like the Blaster, but the Blaster piston can be used with the DT200R. In the Blaster version & some of the DT200WR versions the oil pump is not installed, blanking plug is fitted over the oil pump drive.

The Yamaha WR200 shown above has the same crank & Stroke as the DT200R & ATV Blaster. The WR200 crank cases are similar to the DT200R but with a bigger reed cage port and slightly revised induction port shapes in the crank cases. The WR200 has a larger cylinder bore size of 66.8mm diameter giving a displacement of 199 cm with a standard compression of 6.3:1 in standard form. The standard cylinder is nickel plated and has slightly larger porting plus two boost ports either side of the exhaust port. This in turn makes the WR200 power valve different in shape to allow three exhaust ports to be controlled. The WR200 has a direct cable clutch drive pinion in the clutch cover, where as the DT200R & Blaster use a conventional push rod through the clutch center. The WR200 also uses a larger Mikuni TM30SS Carburetor. The WR200 Frame, Tank, seat, plastics, forks, swingarm, airbox, rear shock and electrics differ from the DT200R.

References

DT200